Stenopterygia subcurva is a moth of the family Noctuidae first described by Francis Walker in 1857. It is found in Sri Lanka.

The male has basal trifine hair-pencils. Forewings with brown facies. Caterpillar blackish with orange-red head. Lateral orange patch found on T1. Setae based on a white dot. Caterpillar usually rests on underside of a leaf. Pupation occurs in a tough oval white silken cocoon covered with earth particles within the soil.

Larval host plant is Ochna.

References

Moths of Asia
Moths described in 1857
Hadeninae